González Gómez may refer to:
Cecilia González Gómez (1961–2017), Mexican politician
Francisco González Gómez (1918–1990), Spanish caricaturist, painter and sculptor
Javier González Gómez aka Javi (born 1974), Spanish retired footballer

See also
Gómez González (disambiguation)